Igor Goldkind was born April 20, 1960, in Lansing, Michigan, and raised in San Diego, California. He is an author, poet, and lecturer who currently specializes in digital storytelling and information architecture.

Biography

The son of San Diego State University anthropology professor Victor Goldkind and painter Margarita Zúñiga Chavaria, Goldkind's passion for literature and art began early in his childhood. At the age of 14, Goldkind served as a volunteer science fiction coordinator for the now wildly popular San Diego Comic-Con. It was in this capacity that he met Ray Bradbury, whom he asked for advice about becoming a writer. Through Comic-Con, Goldkind also befriended Theodore Sturgeon, Larry Niven, Harlan Ellison and others whom he considered to be heroes of the science fiction genre.

After attending San Francisco State University and the University of California, Santa Cruz, earning a degree in philosophy, Goldkind freelanced as a young political journalist. In 1983, he moved to Paris to pursue journalism. It was here that he met and studied with Michel Foucault, the French post-structuralist. After receiving a graduate certificate from the Sorbonne, Goldkind moved to London where he worked first for Titan Books in the 1980s and then for Egmont Fleetway in the 1990s as a marketing consultant and PR spokesperson. Here, Goldkind helped develop and promote the term "graphic novel" as a way to help sell the trade paperback comics then being published. He admits that he "stole the term outright from Will Eisner," with the author's permission. His contribution was to "take the badge [brand] and explain it, contextualise it, and sell it convincingly enough so that bookshop keepers, book distributors and the book trade would accept a new category of 'spine-fiction' on their bookshelves."  Today, the graphic novel is a well-respected, internationally recognized genre.

From 1991 to 1993, Goldkind was a regular writer for the weekly British comic, 2000 AD. Here, he worked on the ongoing Judge Hershey character, and also created The Clown, a satire on the works of Neil Gaiman, which Goldkind likens to "The Sandman on laughing gas".

While in the process of concentrating on his own writing in the 1990s, Goldkind became one of the UK's early innovators in digital media. He set up a digital publishing company called Artemis Communications in 1993 with the highly esteemed graphics artist Dave McKean as art director, to produce interactive dramas based on comics and SF characters. He then evolved the company into one of the first digital agencies in the country, developing many first-ever publishing websites for Oxford University Press, Pearsons Publishing, Lisson Gallery, the Tate Modern, and Usborne Books. In 1998 he established Signa Internet Strategies, considered to be the UK's first exclusively search engine optimization company. Working for companies such as Sony Europe, Goldkind continued to consult and project manage large-scale digital initiatives for a variety of private and public enterprises interested in combining visual art, language, and computation. In 2011, Goldkind became the creative director for a Liverpool-based idea incubator called the SUBVERSIONfactory. In 2014, after living abroad for 30 years, he returned to San Diego to care for his mother.

Goldkind has lectured at Liverpool University, Liverpool College, St. Martins School of Design, and the London College of Printing. With experience in gameplay as information interface, linked open data, and semantic web architecture, he is considered by his contemporaries to be an expert in the growing fields of information architecture, usability standards, and user experience. Actively engaged in many of the grassroots arts and culture movements currently developing in San Diego, Goldkind continues to write on the often controversial subjects of identity and culture, human rights, social action, and the influence of science and technology. He serves both in the U.S. and abroad as the creative mind behind projects which link computational technologies with art, education, and storytelling.
 
According to media releases, Goldkind is currently completing a collection of SF short stories entitled The Village of Light, which unfolds in and around a computer game, and his first novel, The Plague, which is set around the mass outbreak of a cognitive degenerative illness.  he latter is based upon the condition of dementia and Goldkind's experiences surrounding the care of his mother. Goldkind's first work, Is She Available?, incorporates poetry, art, music, and motion, and was due to be published by Chameleon Editions in 2014.

Bibliography
Comics work includes:

 "A Day in the Life" (with Glenn Fabry, in Crisis #39, 1990)
 "Nine Inches to the Mile" (with Phil Winslade, in Revolver #1, 1990)
 "The Soldier and the Farmer" (with David Lloyd and Caroline Dellaporta, in Crisis #44, 1990)
 "The Soldier and the Painter" (with Phil Winslade, in Crisis #48, 1990)
 "The General and the Priest" (with Jim Baikie, in Crisis #54–55, 1991)
 "Lord Jim" (with Steve Sampson, in Crisis #59, 1991)
The Clown:
 "The Clown Book 1" (with Robert Bliss, in 2000 AD #774-779, 1992)
 "The Clown Book 2 Prologue" (with Robert Bliss, in 2000 AD #841, 1993)
 "Vale of Tears" (with Greg Staples, in 2000AD Yearbook 1994, 1993)
 "The Clown Book 2" (with Robert Bliss/Greg Staples/Nick Percival, in 2000 AD #881-888, 1994)
Tharg's Future Shocks: "Lazyview Rest Home" (with Ron Smith, in 2000 AD #831, 1993)
Strontium Dogs: "Angel Blood" (with Jon Beeston/Colin MacNeil, in 2000AD Sci-Fi Special 1993)
Judge Hershey (with Kevin Cullen):
 "A Game of Dolls" (in Judge Dredd Megazine vol. 2 #27-30, 1993)
 "The Harlequin's Dance" (in Judge Dredd Megazine vol. 2 #37-40, 1993)
Vector 13: "Case 667: Suburban Hell" (with Dix and Nick Abadzis, in 2000AD Sci-Fi Special 1996)

Notes
Creative Producer for the SUBVERSIONfactory

References

 Igor Goldkind at Barney 
 

1964 births
Living people
American comics writers
American satirists
American parodists
Writers from Lansing, Michigan